King's Quest V: Absence Makes the Heart Go Yonder! (also known simply as King's Quest V) is a 1990 graphic adventure game by Sierra On-Line. Originally released in November 1990, it featured a significant improvement in graphics (achieved through the introduction of VGA into the series). It was also the first King's Quest installment to replace the typing user interface with a point-and-click user interface. The title is a spoof on the proverb "Absence makes the heart grow fonder".

King's Quest V sold over half million copies and won several awards. It was later released as a fully voiced "talkie" CD-ROM, done by members of the Sierra staff. By summer a Sega CD port of the game was announced, but was never released.

Plot 
In the introduction to the game, a view of Castle Daventry is shown, when suddenly, a mysterious cloaked figure appears. He enchants the castle, causing a whirlwind to appear, which soon engulfs the castle and lifts it out of sight. Because he is out walking when this happens, King Graham is the only member of the royal family to be left behind. He returns to the castle to find that it has disappeared, and is soon confronted by a talking owl named Cedric.

Cedric witnessed the cloaked figure's attack, and tells Graham that it was a powerful, evil wizard named Mordack who stole the castle. Cedric then brings Graham to the land of Serenia, where his master Crispin resides. Crispin is also a wizard, but a good one, who gives Graham some advice, his old wand, and a piece of white snake which allows Graham to speak with animals. Graham then starts on his journey.

Later, Graham learns that Mordack is the brother of the wizard Manannan, whom Graham's son, Prince Alexander, turned into a cat in King's Quest III. Mordack has imprisoned the castle and royal family of Daventry out of revenge, and threatens to feed the royal family to Manannan unless Prince Alexander agrees to restore him to his true form as the spell's nature means that only Prince Alexander as the caster can reverse it. King Graham travels through the land of Serenia, gathering helpful items and information, and eventually makes his way to Mordack's island, and to his castle lair, to save his family from their impending doom.

The owl Cedric accompanies the protagonist King Graham through the entire game to provide commentary and advice. He has to be rescued from danger at several points. The only useful thing the owl does is inadvertently saving Graham's life from a spell near the end of the game.

At the end of the game, with the help of another of Mordack's prisoners, Princess Cassima, Graham is able to confront Mordack in a magical duel, using spells he learns from Mordack's own spell book against him. After Mordack transforms himself into a ring of fire, Graham slays the evil wizard by conjuring a rain storm to put the fire out. The good wizard Crispin arrives soon after and transforms the castle and the royal family back to normal. At Graham's request, Crispin teleports Cassima back to her home in the Land of the Green Isles and sends the royal family back to Daventry.

Connections to other King's Quest games 
Though still largely standalone, King's Quest V is one of the few where the elements of the plot itself are directly connected to events or individuals in both previous and future games. The location the game is set in, Serenia, was first visited in the earlier game Wizard and the Princess. During the game, King Graham discovers the skeleton of a man in the Serenia desert which is identified as the body of the Wanderer, the protagonist from Wizard and the Princess in the King's Quest Companion. The transformation of Manannan into a cat is a necessary task to completing King's Quest III. This act has profound consequences for Alexander (and his family), as it is the impetus for the KQV storyline.

The game's ending ties into its sequel, King's Quest VI. Cassima was introduced as a slave to the wizard Mordack. Before she is sent home at the end, Alexander mentions wanting to visit her in the Land of the Green Isles, which happens at the beginning of KQVI. Cassima mentions her Vizier, who first introduced Mordack to her. In KQVI, Mordack and the Vizier (who is the primary antagonist of KQVI) are both part of an organization known as the Society of the Black Cloak (technically only the Vizier is confirmed to be a member, but members of the organization know of Mordack). Even the music for Cassima in Mordack's castle is enhanced and used for the love theme for Alexander and Cassima. At the end of that game, the Vizier is defeated by Alexander and Cassima and the two marry.

Versions 

King's Quest V was the last in the series to feature EGA and Tandy graphics at 320×200: a separate EGA release contained 16-color 320×200 versions of the graphics, whereas the VGA release featured 320×200 256-color VGA graphics (and, unlike later SCI games, did not support rendering these into 16 colors at 640×200 resolution on EGA cards).

Floppy disk 
The diskette version (EGA and VGA) requires Graham to cast spells throughout the game, requiring the user to refer to the manual as a form of copy protection. This was omitted in the CD-ROM version. The disk version has a slightly different game interface, similar to the version later used in the NES version, the main difference being that there is an additional walk option. Several of the animated characters including the rat, the ant, and the bee, have large closeup pictures of their upper torsos, that are fully animated, including arms and, for the insects, antennae. The ant, for example, even raises up the golden needle. These closeups and animations were modified or mostly cut from the CD-ROM version (which only shows closeups on the characters' faces).

CD-ROM 
Released in 1992, the CD-ROM version is mastered in the High Sierra Format, unrelated to the publisher's name. This version added voice acting. There are also many script differences between the floppy and CD-ROM versions. Many of the narrative descriptions were modified, and lines were added to characters that did not have speaking roles. For example, the snake and some of the villagers are given a few quotes, whereas they did not speak at all, and ignored Graham in the floppy version. Many of the characters have close up pictures (taken from the floppy) that were given various colored backgrounds behind them, and a frame around them (though the frame cuts off some details). The snake is even given a close up picture for its new speaking parts and a few of the characters are given more lines.

NES 
In order to make the Nintendo Entertainment System adaptation more family-friendly and release it to stores everywhere, Nintendo of America had to follow its Video Game Content Guidelines requiring it to tone down violence, nudity, language, alcohol reference, and religious themes in the games it released and it was published by Konami, rather than Sierra On-Line. One example is Graham's water-drinking scene in the desert, where the narrator's words say, "Ah, life-giving water. Nectar of the Gods. Graham can now feel strength and renewal flowing through him" in the PC version, while in the NES adaptation it says, "Ah! The cool water felt wonderful on Graham's parched lips and his body now feels rejuvenated". This was edited due to religious themes. Another example has Queen Icebella ordering the wolves to take Graham and Cedric to the dungeons for ever, instead of actually killing them. Cedric is turned to 'stone', rather than Mordack actually killing him. In the Konami release, this obviously was to censor out the threatened violence, but the threatened violence was shown in the Sierra On-Line release.

Atari ST 
An Atari ST version was announced via Sierra Online's magazine: Sierra News Magazine for a Spring 1991 release but was later canceled. Sierra's Srini Vasan and Sierra UK fought for continued Atari ST development but Sierra Online discontinued Atari ST support entirely shortly afterwards.

Development 
The game had a total budget of around one million dollars. Sierra used similar animation techniques that Disney had applied for The Little Mermaid by rotoscoping live actors for the framework of the character sprites and the animation frames. The background scenes were hand drawn, painted and scanned. For the CD version, a voice-sampling technique was used for the speech as well as removal of many text boxes in order to make the game fit on disc.

Reception 
King's Quest V sold 250,000 copies by February 1993, and sales ultimately surpassed 500,000 copies. According to Sierra On-Line, combined sales of the King's Quest series surpassed 3.8 million units by the end of March 1996. By November 2000, PC Data reported that King's Quest Vs sales in the United States alone had reached between 300,000 and 400,000 units.

Computer Gaming Worlds Scorpia in 1991 praised the "tour de force" VGA graphics, sound card audio, non-typing parser and user interface, but criticized the gigantic, yet almost pointless, desert map. She concluded that the game was best for new adventurers because of its easy puzzles, and a "pleasant diversion" for more-experienced players. In 1991, Dragon gave the game 4 out of 5 stars.

In April 1993 Computer Gaming Worlds Charles Ardai called the voice acting in the CD-ROM version of the game "wooden". In April 1994 the magazine said that "the quality of the voice acting covers the gamut from excellent to mediocre and, in some cases, can grate on the nerves", but the CD version was still preferable because "other enhancements are excellent". In 2007, Adventure Gamers gave the game a three out of five stars. Allgame also gave the PC original four out of five stars, while giving its NES adaptation two-and-a-half stars.

King's Quest V won the 1991 Software Publishers Association Excellence in Software Award for Best Fantasy Role-Playing/Adventure Program, Computer Gaming World named the game as its 1991 Adventure Game of the Year, and in 1992 named it to the magazine's Hall of Fame for games readers rated highly over time. In 1992 King's Quest V was voted "Best Multimedia Fantasy/Adventure Game" by readers of MPC World. In 1996 Computer Gaming World named King's Quest V the 94th best game ever. The editors wrote that "Roberta Williams horrified Sierra traditionalists by getting the parser out of the way of some of the most beautiful graphics ever".

In other games 
Sierra displayed their acknowledgement at the criticisms of King's Quest V through references to the game in several of their releases:
 In Space Quest IV, Cedric acts as an enemy in the Ms. Astro Chicken arcade game.
 In Space Quest 6, the game mocks Cedric whenever Roger tries to tell the elevator door to open or close.
 In Freddy Pharkas: Frontier Pharmacist, Cedric can be seen perched atop a cactus, and then later eviscerated by vultures.
 In King's Quest VI, the pawn shop features various references to the problems with KQV and other past games in the series.
 In Quest For Glory: Shadow of Darkness, one of the possible wrong answers to a riddle from Leshy is Cedric, to which Leshy then shudders.

King's Quest V also inspired a text-based remake, King's Quest V – The Text Adventure, and also another parody fan-game Owl's Quest: Every Owl Has Its Day starring Cedric which pokes fun at many of the situations and mannerisms of Cedric.

References

External links 
 
 King's Quest V Technical Help at the Sierra Help Pages
 King's Quest V at the Sierra Chest

1990 video games
Adventure games
Amiga games
Cancelled Sega CD games
Classic Mac OS games
DOS games
FM Towns games
Games commercially released with DOSBox
King's Quest
Konami games
NEC PC-9801 games
Nintendo Entertainment System games
ScummVM-supported games
Sierra Entertainment games
Point-and-click adventure games
Video games scored by Mark Seibert
Windows games
Video games developed in the United States